Strasbourg is a small town in the Canadian province of  Saskatchewan, located about 75 km away from the provincial capital, Regina.

The school, William Derby School, which holds kindergarten to Grade 12 has 260 students.

History
The earliest settlers came to this area around 1884 as the area became known for its rich agricultural soil and ample land for pastures. The area was settled by German pioneers. The town was originally spelled Strassburg, Strass meaning road or street in German and burg meaning castle. The name was changed by Canada's Geography department to the French spelling of Strasbourg in 1919, following the renaming of the latter located in Alsace, France (Germany lost control of the city after World War I). The town was incorporated in 1907.

Parks and recreation
The Strasbourg Recreation Centre, which was built in 1976, has an ice rink and a curling rink. It is home to the Strasbourg Maroons of the senior men's Highway Hockey League. Strasbourg also has a 9-hole golf course and ball diamonds.

Twenty-five kilometres to the south-west of town on Last Mountain Lake is Rowan's Ravine Provincial Park and to the north-east is Last Mountain.

Demographics 

Notable people
 Frederick Bieber - Harvard Medical School professor
 Greg Hubick - Played in the NHL for the Toronto Maple Leafs and Vancouver Canucks
 Nick Schultz - Professional ice hockey player 
 Bennet Wong - Psychiatrist
Garry Lee - Philanthropist.

See also
List of towns in Saskatchewan
List of communities in Saskatchewan

References

External links

Towns in Saskatchewan
German-Canadian culture in Saskatchewan
McKillop No. 220, Saskatchewan
Division No. 6, Saskatchewan